Kuolimo is a medium-sized lake in south-eastern Finland, in the municipalities of Savitaipale and Suomenniemi.

Lake Kuolimo is closely linked to Finland's largest lake Saimaa, and discharges into it through two separate routes, featuring the rapids of Partakoski and  Kärnänkoski. The lakes belong to the Vuoksi river basin, which drains through Lake Ladoga to the Gulf of Finland.

Kuolimo is considered a particularly clean-water lake. It is inhabited by a relict population of the Arctic char. The critically endangered fish  lives only certain parts of southern Lake Saimaa, including Yövesi, Luonteri and Ruokovesi. The original population lives only in Lake Kuolimo. Fishing of the Arctic char is totally prohibited.

References

See also
List of lakes in Finland

LKuolimo
Bifurcation lakes
Lakes of Savitaipale
Lakes of Mikkeli